Anthony Graham (born 13 April 1990) is a Zimbabwean born English male professional squash player. He achieved his highest career ranking of 98 on August, 2012 during the 2012 PSA World Tour.

References 

1990 births
Living people
English male squash players
Sportspeople from Mutare
English people of Zimbabwean descent
People from The Plains, Virginia